Roaring Valley is a moraine-filled valley on the north side of Mount Dromedary, formerly occupied by the coalescing glaciers that descend northeast and north from Mount Kempe and Mount Dromedary. The New Zealand Victoria University of Wellington Antarctic Expedition (VUWAE), 1960-61 named this feature after they experienced strong winds at most campsites in the area—but none as violent and destructive force as the winds that struck their camp at the valley mouth.

See also
Lake Porkchop

References

Valleys of Victoria Land
Scott Coast